This is a list of notable events in country music that took place in 2016.

Events
January 7 – Rachel Reinert announces that she is leaving the band Gloriana.
January 26 – Thomas Rhett's "Die a Happy Man" spends a sixth week at No. 1 on Country Airplay, becoming the first artist to spend six or more weeks atop that chart since Taylor Swift did so with "Our Song" in late 2007.
February 11 – Charles Kelley and wife Cassie McConnell welcome first child, son Ward Charles Kelley.
March 1 – Don Williams announces his retirement after six decades in the music business. He died in September 2017 at age 78.
March 4 – Loretta Lynn releases her album Full Circle. This album is the first album from Lynn in over a decade since 2004s Van Lear Rose
March 7 – Dolly Parton announces plans for her first major North American tour in 25 years.
May 12 – ABC cancels musical drama Nashville after four seasons. One month later, the series is picked up by CMT.
 June 1 – The Dixie Chicks begin their DCX MMXVI World Tour, the first time the band has toured North America in ten years.
 July 11 – The body of Craig Morgan's 19-year-old son, Jerry Greer, is recovered from Kentucky Lake.
 September 16 – A total of 30 artists gather to record "Forever Country", a single released in honor of the 50th annual Country Music Association awards. The song immediately debuted on country radio and reached the Hot Country Airplay's top 40 in its first week on the chart; on the all-encompassing Hot Country Songs chart, the song debuted at No. 1 the week of October 8, the third song to do so since its inception in 2012.
 December 17 – Benny Birchfield, the widower of country music singer Jean Shepard, is injured following an attack at his home, where two others died. One of the victims was Icie Hawkins, granddaughter of Shepard and Hawkshaw Hawkins.

Top hits of the year
The following songs placed within the Top 20 on the Hot Country Songs, Country Airplay or Canada Country charts in 2016:

Singles released by American artists

Singles released by Canadian artists

Notes
"—" denotes releases that did not chart

Top new album releases
The following albums placed on the Top Country Albums charts in 2016:

Deaths
 January 8 – Red Simpson, 81, singer-songwriter best known for the 1971 hit "I'm a Truck." (heart attack)
 January 18 – Glenn Frey, 67, founding member of the Eagles (numerous complications)
 February 22 – Sonny James, 87, singer and Country Music Hall of Fame member (natural causes).
 March 4 – Joey Martin Feek, 40, one-half of husband-and-wife duo Joey + Rory (cervical cancer)
 March 9 – Ray Griff, 75, Canadian singer-songwriter (aspiration pneumonia)
 March 18 – Ned Miller, 90, singer of the 1960s, best known for "From a Jack to a King."
April 6 – Merle Haggard, 79, singer-songwriter with many hits between the 1960s and 1980s, known as a pioneer of the Bakersfield sound (pneumonia).
May 16 – Emilio Navaira, 53, Tejano and country music singer, best known for the 1995 hit "It's Not the End of the World" (heart attack).
May 17 – Guy Clark, 74, singer-songwriter best known for hits recorded by Rodney Crowell, Ricky Skaggs, Steve Wariner and others (cancer).
June 23 – Ralph Stanley, 89, legendary bluegrass pioneer who was a member of The Stanley Brothers and the Grand Ole Opry (skin cancer)
July 16 – Bonnie Brown, 77, member of The Browns (lung cancer)
August 5 – Richard Fagan, 69, songwriter best known for co-writing two of John Michael Montgomery's number one hits: "Sold (The Grundy County Auction Incident)" and "Be My Baby Tonight" (liver cancer).
September 1 – Kacey Jones, 66, singer-songwriter and humorist, writer of the Mickey Gilley hit "I'm the One Mama Warned You About", cancer.
September 21 – John D. Loudermilk, 82, singer and songwriter.
September 25 – Jean Shepard, 82, pioneering female country artist and the only woman to be a member of the Opry for sixty years (Parkinson's disease).
October 30 – Curly Putman, 85, songwriter, known for writing or co-writing classics such as "Green, Green Grass of Home", "D-I-V-O-R-C-E" and "He Stopped Loving Her Today".
November 15 – Holly Dunn, 59, singer-songwriter and former Opry member best known for this hits "Daddy's Hands", "Are You Ever Gonna Love Me" and "You Really Had Me Going" (ovarian cancer).
December 2 – Mark Gray, 64, singer-songwriter and member of Exile from 1979 and 1982.
December 18 – Gordie Tapp, 94, comedian and longtime cast member of the television series Hee Haw.

Hall of Fame inductees

Bluegrass Music Hall of Fame Inductees
 Ken Irwin
 Marian Leighton-Levy
 Bill Nowlin
 Clarence White

Country Music Hall of Fame inductees
 Fred Foster, music executive and founder of Monument Records (born 1931).
 Charlie Daniels, singer-songwriter and musician (born 1936).
 Randy Travis, singer-songwriter and leading figure in the neotraditionalist movement of the 1980s (born 1959).

Canadian Country Music Hall of Fame inductees
Murray McLauchlan
Paul Mascioli

Major awards

Academy of Country Music
(presented April 2, 2017 in Las Vegas)
Entertainer of the Year – Jason Aldean
Top Male Vocalist – Thomas Rhett
Top Female Vocalist – Miranda Lambert
Top Vocal Group – Little Big Town
Top Vocal Duo – Brothers Osborne
New Male Vocalist – Jon Pardi
New Female Vocalist – Maren Morris
New Vocal Duo or Group – Brothers Osborne
Album of the Year – The Weight of These Wings, Miranda Lambert
Single Record of the Year – "H.O.L.Y.", Florida Georgia Line
Song of the Year – "Die a Happy Man", Thomas Rhett
Video of the Year – "Forever Country", Artists of Then, Now & Forever
Vocal Event of the Year – "May We All", Florida Georgia Line feat. Tim McGraw

ACM Honors
 (presented August 30, 2016)
Career Achievement Award – Glen Campbell
Cliffie Stone Pioneer Award – Crystal Gayle, The Statler Brothers and Tanya Tucker
Jim Reeves International Award – Jeff Walker
Merle Haggard Spirit Award – Miranda Lambert
Poet's Award – Jimmy Webb and Eddie Rabbitt
Crystal Milestone Award – Little Big Town
Mae Boren Axton Award – Keith Urban
Gary Harber Lifting Lives Award – Carrie Underwood
Songwriter of the Year – Ross Copperman

Americana Music Honors & Awards 
Album of the Year – Something More Than Free (Jason Isbell)
Artist of the Year – Chris Stapleton
Duo/Group of the Year – Emmylou Harris and Rodney Crowell
Song of the Year – "24 frames" (Jason Isbell)
Emerging Artist of the Year – Margo Price
Instrumentalist of the Year – Sara Watkins
Spirit of Americana/Free Speech Award – Billy Bragg
Lifetime Achievement: Trailblazer – Shawn Colvin
Lifetime Achievement: Songwriting – William Bell
Lifetime Achievement: Performance – Bob Weir

American Country Countdown Awards
(presented May 1 in Los Angeles)
Artist of the Year – Luke Bryan
Male Vocalist of the Year – Luke Bryan
Female Vocalist of the Year – Carrie Underwood
Group/Duo of the Year – Florida Georgia Line
Song of the Year – "Die a Happy Man", Thomas Rhett
Album of the Year – Traveller, Chris Stapleton
Digital Song of the Year – "Girl Crush", Little Big Town
Digital Album of the Year – Montevallo, Sam Hunt
Breakthrough Male of the Year – Sam Hunt
Breakthrough Female of the Year – Kelsea Ballerini
Breakthrough Group/Duo of the Year – Old Dominion
Touring Artist of the Year – Garth Brooks
Nash Icon – Brooks & Dunn

Academy of Country Music

American Music Awards(presented in November 20 in Los Angeles)Favorite Country Male Artist – Blake Shelton
Favorite Country Female Artist – Carrie Underwood
Favorite Country Album – Storyteller, Carrie Underwood
Favorite Country Song – "Humble and Kind", Tim McGraw

 ARIA Awards (presented in Sydney on November 23, 2016)Best Country Album – Silos (Sara Storer)

Canadian Country Music Association(presented September 11 in London, Ontario)Fans' Choice Awards – Brett Kissel
Album of the Year – Tin Roof, Gord Bamford
Female Artist of the Year – Jess Moskaluke
Male Artist of the Year – Brett Kissel
Group or Duo of the Year – High Valley
Single of the Year – "Bring Down the House", Dean Brody
CMT Video of the Year – "Bring Down the House", Dean Brody
Songwriter of the Year – Dean Brody ("Bring Down the House")
Roots Artist of the Year – The Washboard Union
Interactive Artist of the Year – Brett Kissel
Rising Star – The Washboard Union

Country Music Association(presented November 2 in Nashville)Entertainer of the Year – Garth Brooks
Single of the Year – "Die a Happy Man", Thomas Rhett
Male Vocalist of the Year – Chris Stapleton
Female Vocalist of the Year – Carrie Underwood
New Artist of the Year – Maren Morris
Musical Event of the Year – "Different for Girls", Dierks Bentley featuring Elle King
Album of the Year – Mr. Misunderstood, Eric Church
Music Video of the Year – "Fire Away", Chris Stapleton
Song of the Year – "Humble and Kind", Lori McKenna
Vocal Duo of the Year – Brothers Osborne
Vocal Group of the Year – Little Big Town
Musician of the Year – Dann Huff
Willie Nelson Lifetime Achievement Award – Dolly Parton
Pinnacle Award – Kenny Chesney

CMT Music Awards(presented on June 8 in Nashville)Video of the Year – "Humble and Kind", Tim McGraw
Male Video of the Year – "Die a Happy Man", Thomas Rhett
Female Video of the Year – "Smoke Break", Carrie Underwood
Group/Duo Video of the Year – "Girl Crush", Little Big Town
Breakthrough Video of the Year – "Fire Away", Chris Stapleton
CMT Performance of the Year – "Smoke Break", Carrie Underwood from Instant JamCMT Social Superstar – Blake Shelton

CMT Artists of the Year
 (presented on October 20, 2016, in Nashville)Kelsea Ballerini
Luke Bryan
Florida Georgia Line
Thomas Rhett
Chris Stapleton
Carrie Underwood

Grammy Awards(presented February 12, 2017 in Los Angeles)Best Country Solo Performance – My Church (Maren Morris)
Best Country Duo/Group Performance – Jolene (Pentatonix ft. Dolly Parton)
Best Country Song – Humble and Kind (Lori McKenna)
Best Country Album – A Sailor's Guide to Earth (Sturgill Simpson)
Best Bluegrass Album – Coming Home (Mark O'Connor Band)
Best Americana Album – This Is Where I Live (William Bell)
Best American Roots Performance – House of Mercy (Sarah Jarosz)
Best American Roots Song – Kid Sister (Vince Gill)
Best Roots Gospel Album – Hymns That Are Important to Us (Joey + Rory)

Juno Awards(presented April 2, 2017 in Ottawa)Country Album of the Year – Kiss Me Quiet'' (Jess Moskaluke)

See also
 Country Music Association
 Inductees of the Country Music Hall of Fame

References

Country
Country music by year